Geoffrey Blancaneaux was the defending champion but chose not to defend his title.

Tseng Chun-hsin won the title after defeating Nuno Borges 5–7, 7–5, 6–2 in the final.

Seeds

Draw

Finals

Top half

Bottom half

References

External links
Main draw
Qualifying draw

Maia Challenger II - 1